Leese may refer to:

People
 The Leese family, an English aristocratic family
 Arnold Leese, a late British fascist politician
 Joseph Leese, a late British politician
 Oliver Leese, a late British World War II general
 Richard Leese, a British politician

Place
 Leese, Germany, a municipality in Lower Saxony, Germany

See also
 Lees (disambiguation)
 Lease
 McLeese (disambiguation)